Cladobrostis melitricha is a moth of the family Agonoxenidae. It is found in India.  It's the sole species in its genus. One of its food sources is Sindora siamensis.

References

Moths described in 1921
Agonoxeninae
Moths of Asia